Munsusan is a mountain located in Ulju County, and Nam-gu, Ulsan, South Korea.

See also
Geography of Korea
List of mountains in Korea
List of mountains by elevation
Mountain portal
South Korea portal

References

Mountains of Ulsan
Mountains of South Gyeongsang Province
Ulju County
Nam District, Ulsan
Mountains of South Korea